Kristen Ashley (born Kristen A L Moutaw: April 8, 1968) is a New York Times and USA Today bestselling author of more than 75 books in 14 languages, with over three million copies sold.
  Two of her novels have been adapted into film.

Career
Ashley has always enjoyed books.  At age 12, she began surreptitiously borrowing her mother's Harlequin Presents romance novels and fell in love with the genre.   As an adult, Ashley began writing books in the evenings, after she finished a long day of working in the medical field - first at the Rocky Mountain MS Center, then the Colorado Neurological Institute, and then, after a move to Bristol, England, at The Pituitary Foundation.  Over 15 years, Ashley wrote almost 25 romance novels.  She attempted to find an agent or a publisher for her works but was consistently rejected.

Ashley finally decided to publish her work independently on Kindle.  She released three or four of her previously written titles each month and found an audience relatively quickly.  Her readership expanded after a major blogger reviewed one of her novels, Sweet Dreams. Between her day job and her writing and publishing efforts, Ashley worked, on average, 14–16 hours a day, seven days a week, for years.  Once her writing career reached a certain threshold, Ashley hired help; she now has an assistant and works with graphic designers, proofreaders, and copyeditors.

In 2013, Ashley signed her first traditional publishing contract, with Grand Central Publishing's Forever line.  As of 2019, she had released three series' worth of books through traditional publishing.  Ashley chose to foray into traditional publishing for two primary reasons.  First, she wanted to improve her craft by working with an experienced editor.  Second, she wanted to make her books more accessible.  With traditional publishing, her novels would be available in print as well as ebooks, which would expand her audience to people without ereaders and those who liked to browse bookstores and libraries.  Ashley insisted that her publisher keep ebook prices low, at $3.99, to ensure that readers weren't priced out.  In an interview in 2019, she noted that her "print sales are abysmal"; most of her income comes from ebook sales and merchandise that she creates based on her books.

Passionflix purchased the film rights to several of Ashley's novels.  The Will, based on Ashley's novel of the same name, was released on February 14, 2020.  It was directed by Louise Alston and starred Megan Dodds, Chris McKenna, Martin Dingle-Wall and Patrick Byas.  In 2020, Passionflix will be filming an adaption of Ashleys' "Three Wishes".

As of 2019, Ashley had published more than 60 novels, which have been translated into 14 languages and sold a combined three million copies.

Reception
Her novel Raid was on the USA Today bestseller list.  Own the Wind placed on the New York Times bestseller list.  She won the Romantic Times Book Reviews Reviewer's Choice Award for Best Romantic Suspense for Law Man, and the Romance Reviews Reader's Choice Award for Ride Steady.  She was nominated for Romantic Times awards for Best Independent Contemporary Romance (Hold On) and Best Contemporary Romance (Breathe).  Four of her novels (Motorcycle Man, The Will, 'Ride Steady, and The Hookup'') have been finalists for Goodreads Choice Awards in the Romance category.

Writing
As influences, Ashley cites Janet Evanovich, Judith McNaught, JK Rowling, Carl Hiaasen.

In interviews, Ashley states that she struggled with sleep due to an active mind, which she turned to creating stories that she continued developing over time. Her heroes are often Alpha males with the heroine bringing a strong character to match them. Her heroines run the gamut from independent women who run their own businesses to more traditional women whose utmost goal is to become a mother.  Family, friends and music are recurring thematic elements. She claims that she does not tone down or restrict her characters into the typical hero and heroines found in romance novels, this being part of the reason for rejections by traditional publishers. She notes that "I celebrate imperfections. ...None of my characters are perfect. They don’t say the right thing. They get exhausted and they pick at each other and they bicker."  She has written racially diverse characters, as well as LGBTQ characters.

Though mainly in the romance genre, she covers other sub-genres in her work, including; fantasy, erotica and paranormal

Bibliography

References

External links 
Official Website: KristenAshley.net
 
 Kristen Ashley on FictionDB.com

Living people
1968 births
21st-century American women writers
21st-century American novelists
American romantic fiction writers
American women novelists
Women romantic fiction writers
Novelists from Arizona
Purdue University alumni